Manimeldura Chaminda Mendis (born 28 December 1968) is a former Sri Lankan cricketer who was born in Galle, Sri Lanka. He played one ODI for the Sri Lankans in 1994 debuting against New Zealand, which was his only international match. He also played for the Colts Cricket Club, Western Province, Sri Lanka A and Sri Lanka. In November 2018, he was named on Sri Lanka Cricket's National Selection Panel.

References

1968 births
Sri Lankan cricketers
Sri Lanka One Day International cricketers
Living people
Basnahira South cricketers
Colts Cricket Club cricketers
Cricketers from Galle